Elephantotus is a genus of horse flies in the family Tabanidae.

Species
Elephantotus tracuateuensis Gorayeb, 2014

References

Tabanidae
Brachycera genera
Diptera of South America